This is a list of members of the Victorian Legislative Assembly, from the elections of 5 & 21 October and 3 November 1864 to the elections of 30 December 1865, 15 and 29 January 1866. Victoria was a British self-governing colony in Australia at the time.

 
Note the "Term in Office" refers to that members term(s) in the Assembly, not necessarily for that electorate.

 Vale resigned in August 1865, re-elected in September 1865.

Francis Murphy was Speaker.

References

Members of the Parliament of Victoria by term
19th-century Australian politicians